Jane Foster is a fictional character appearing in comic books and films by Marvel.

Jane Foster may also refer to:

 Jane Foster Zlatovski (1912–1979), a diplomat and alleged spy
 Jane McDowell Foster Wiley (1829–1903), spouse of composer Stephen Foster
 Jane Foster (pilot), Royal Canadian Air Force pilot
 Jane Foster (Marvel Cinematic Universe)

See also
 Foster (surname)
 Mary-Jane Foster, actress and politician